Ayouba Traoré (born 9 August 1982) is a heavyweight judoka from Mali. He competed at the 2016 Summer Olympics, in the 100 kg category, and was eliminated by Cyrille Maret in the first bout.

Traoré works at a French international school in Bamako.

References

External links
 

1982 births
Living people
Malian male judoka
Olympic judoka of Mali
Judoka at the 2016 Summer Olympics
21st-century Malian people